For Anarchism: History, Theory, and Practice is a 1989 book of essays by anarchists on the history, theory, and practice of anarchism. The essays, derived from Leeds Anarchist Research Group meetings in 1985 and 1986, was edited by David Goodway and published by Routledge.

See also 
 List of books about anarchism

References

Further reading

External links 

 

1989 non-fiction books
1989 anthologies
Essay anthologies
British anthologies
British non-fiction books
Books about anarchism
Routledge books